Paloveopsis is a genus of flowering plants in the family Fabaceae. It belongs to the subfamily Detarioideae.

Detarioideae
Fabaceae genera